Bibenzonium bromide is a cough suppressant.

References 

Antitussives
Quaternary ammonium compounds
Bromides
Ethers